St. Anthony's Church and School is a Romanesque Revival style church and an accompanying school at 514 W. Main St. and 103 N 6th Street in Cedar Rapids, Nebraska within the Roman Catholic Archdiocese of Omaha.

Description
Both the current church and the school were designed by Omaha architect Jacob M. Nachtigall.  The school was built in 1911 and expanded in 1926;  the church was built during 1918–1919.

The complex was added to the National Register in 2000.

References

External links 
More photos of the St. Anthony's Church at Wikimedia Commons

Churches on the National Register of Historic Places in Nebraska
School buildings on the National Register of Historic Places in Nebraska
Romanesque Revival church buildings in Nebraska
Colonial Revival architecture in Nebraska
Roman Catholic churches completed in 1919
Buildings and structures in Boone County, Nebraska
Churches in the Roman Catholic Archdiocese of Omaha
National Register of Historic Places in Boone County, Nebraska
1911 establishments in Nebraska
20th-century Roman Catholic church buildings in the United States